Lazarus Eitaro Salii (17 November 1936 – 20 August 1988) was a politician from Palau. He served as the second elected President of Palau from 25 October 1985 until he committed suicide on 20 August 1988, amid bribery allegations.

Salii was elected to the Senate of Micronesian Congress. He was involved in the Palau Constitutional Convention of 1978. After the Constitution took effect in 1981, he became an ambassador. As ambassador, he was given wide-ranging authority to negotiate with the U.S. ambassador. He was ambassador until 1984, when he became a senator, representing Koror in the Palau National Congress.

When President Haruo Remeliik was assassinated on 30 June 1985, Salii was elected in August to finish his term of office (although Thomas Remengesau and then Alfonso Oiterong served in the interim). Following his suicide by gunshot in 1988, he was succeeded by Vice President Remengesau as president for the remainder of his term, followed by Ngiratkel Etpison as the fifth president.

References

1936 births
1988 deaths
Politicians who committed suicide
Members of the Senate of Palau
Presidents of Palau
Suicides in Palau
Heads of state who committed suicide
People from Angaur
Deaths by firearm in Palau
Ambassadors of Palau
Members of the Congress of the Trust Territory of the Pacific Islands
20th-century Palauan politicians